Mandi Bahauddin is a city in central north Punjab, Pakistan.

Mandi Bahauddin may also refer to:
Mandi Bahauddin District, a district of Punjab, Pakistan
Mandi Bahauddin Tehsil, a tehsil of district Mandi Bahauddin
Mandi Bahauddin railway station, a railway station in Pakistan

See also
 Mandi (disambiguation)